Hull Stingrays were a British ice hockey club from Kingston upon Hull who was a member of the Elite Ice Hockey League from 2003 until 2015. They played their home games at Hull Arena.

The Stingrays replaced previous clubs Humberside Seahawks (1988–1999) and Hull Thunder (1999–2003). On 10 August 2010, owners Mike & Sue Pack announced that the club was ceasing operations due to a lack of funds to complete the 2010–11 season, but a takeover by Elite League rivals Coventry Blaze was confirmed on 17 August 2010, enabling the team to take its place in the Elite League for the 2010–11 season. At the end of the 2011–12 season Coventry Blaze announced their intention to sell the Stingrays. The Coventry-based ownership accepted an offer from Stingrays' bench coach Bobby McEwan in May 2012. On 24 June 2015, the club announced on its official website that it has been placed into liquidation.

History

Predecessors

The city has a long history of ice hockey, with the Seahawks, later named Hawks operating between 1988 and 1999, and were succeeded by the Thunder until 2003.

Rebirth
The Stingrays were formed in 2003 replacing the Hull Thunder as members of the British National League. The new owners, Mike and Sue Pack along with Rick Strachan, who served as head coach through the end of the 2008–09 season, came with a promise of financial stability.

The initial challenge for the club was to re-establish the belief that the Hull Arena could host a team playing professional hockey at all, following a previous history of failed attempts, some valiant and some best forgotten.

Unfortunately the damage to the sport's credibility in the city was a burden that was not easily shaken off and some of the fans stayed away waiting for what they thought was the inevitable to happen. But the ownership were true to their word and a season was completed without any of the previous crises that had become common place. Stability was established and although success on the ice proved more elusive, as Rick Strachan said at the time "The bus is moving in the right direction."

The team had very much an Eastern European feel to it and was captained by local idol, Stephen Johnson, tempted back from a threatened retirement for one last season. Alongside him the Ukrainian contingent included a guy who made a huge impact for his never say die attitude and innovative use of the six words of English that he had mastered, fans favourite Evgeny Alipov – 'Big Al'.

So the foundation was in place and with the first objective of stability secured and confidence building, the club entered the next season in the BNL keen to apply the lessons learnt and to start to climb the ratings.

2004/2005
Although still very much having to keep a close eye on the purse strings, the squad had a much stronger feel to it when the first puck dropped on the 2004–05 campaign.

Coach Strachan brought in Scott Wray, Jeff Glowa, Craig Minard and Ladislav Kudrna in nets to join Alipov, Nikolaev, Burgess, Gomenyuk as his eight import contingent and with a strong British content including Slava Koulikov, and the Phillips brothers, hopes were high.

A 'top four finish' was predicted by the coach but this turned out not to be ambitious enough. Stingrays were overtaken for second place in the last fortnight by Guildford and Newcastle, the team made the Winter Cup semi-finals and gained a play-off place.

Amazingly it could have been even better had star defenceman Minard decided not to quit the club in November leaving a young British defence to be marshalled by Gomenyuk. Another blow followed when free-scoring Scott Wray had to return home for personal reasons. Not surprisingly the replacements proved not to be as effective and the team's form suffered.

That season was memorable for the 'crossover' competition that pitched the British National League teams against their bigger spending, import heavy neighbours in the Elite League. Widely expected to provide one sided games, the reality was a little different and most of the games provided sporting contests worthy of the name.

Although the Stingrays had to endure a couple of bad losses during this competition they also achieved memorable victories over Coventry, London and Sheffield at home, and also took the points off Cardiff on the road. Goalie Kudrna was often the hero and his performances gained him a place, with Gomenyuk on the BNL All-star team.

The crossover competition was planned to be a potential precursor to a closer relationship between the two leagues but, in fact, the reality was far from that – 2004–05 season proved to be the last for the British National League.

Following the culmination of the season; Edinburgh Capitals and Newcastle Vipers decided to resign from the BNL in order to join the premier EIHL. As this would leave the BNL with only five teams; and thus with little option but to fold, the Capitals and Vipers temporarily withdrew their applications so as to allow the remaining BNL teams to apply for EIHL status. However, terms could not be agreed between the EIHL and the remaining five BNL teams; leading the Capitals and Vipers to resubmit their original applications and join the EIHL; which ultimately resulted in the closure of the BNL. This led the Stingrays, along with fellow former BNL members Bracknell Bees and Guildford Flames, to move to the English Premier Ice Hockey League.

2005/2006 – The EPL
The Stingrays embarked on what was the only viable option and a team was put together which we thought could be effective in that league. But with the work permit regulations ruling out re-engaging any of the Ukrainian core of the previous team, the recruitment was going to be key. The season proved to be a tough one and although the club gained a cup-final spot after a memorable 16 shot penalty shoot out victory over the Guildford Flames the club failed to pick up the silverware after being edged out by Bracknell.

A young British contingent struggled against some of the more experienced and mature squads and the mid-table slot felt an under achievement following the previous years progress.

2006/2007 – The EIHL
The Packs were unhappy playing their team in the Premier League. Travelling costs were significant for the predominantly south-east based league and spectator numbers fell. After the end of the 2005–06 season, the Stingrays sought admission into the Elite Ice Hockey League. Their application was finally approved after weeks of speculation on 22 June 2006. Hull now have a representative in the top-flight division of British Ice Hockey for the first time since the Humberside Hawks played in the Premier Division of the British Hockey League in the 1995–96 season.
In the first four years of its life, the club was in the unique position of competing in all three of the country's senior leagues and it is a major achievement that Hull hockey has moved on and can now provide the supporter with a view of the best Ice Hockey teams and the best players in the land.

The Stingrays had a tough start to their life in the EIHL as they fought to the death for a playoff place, eventually finishing 9th as their decision to opt with a mix of their old Eastern European style with several Canadians ultimately did not pay off.

In 2007 Lifetime Sports Ltd, the Hull Stingrays parent company, established itself as a Community Interest Company. This means that it is a non-profit making organisation dedicated to providing services and facilities to the community in which it operates, that being, Hull, Humberside and the East Riding.

2007/2008
For the 2007–08 season Rick Strachan once again decided to change his signing policy, this time ditching the Eastern European, and predominantly Ukrainian approach, by signing North Americans such as Bryce Thoma, Paul Cabana, Rob Rankin, Brad Patterson, Jake Riddle and Garry Luini. Once again the Stingrays failed to make a consistent impact on the league as they finished in 10th, and last place, 5 points behind 9th placed Basingstoke Bison.

2008/2009
The Stingrays once again finished outside the playoffs in 2008–09, missing out on the post season by seven points, for the third year in a row. At the end of the season, Stingrays coach, Rick Strachan, was asked to step down. Stingrays co-owners Sue and Mike Pack cited financial reasons for the departure of Strachan, who was eventually replaced by Sylvain Cloutier on 9 April 2009. Rick Strachan remains a director of the club. Cloutier is backed up by former teammate Curtis Huppe as Assistant Coach, and both will continue playing.

2009/2010
The Stingrays finished 8th in the 2009–10 Elite League season, gaining 43 points from 56 games, finishing only 3 points behind the 7th place Newcastle Vipers. This is the highest tally for points the team has gained since becoming the Stingrays in 2003, beating the previous record of 39. The team also achieved in excess of .500 hockey in the period from Christmas to the end of the season, the first time it had done so over a sustained period.

2010/2011
Shortly before the 2010–11 EIHL season was about to begin, club owners Mike and Sue Pack announced the team was to no longer operate due to financial issues. However, on 17 August 2010, only six days after the closure of the club was confirmed, a takeover by Elite League rivals Coventry Blaze was confirmed, enabling the team to take its place in the Elite League for the 2010–11 season.

Despite their financial difficulties and a late start to the 2010–11 season (which resulted in the team having to play an unenviable 10 games in 20 days towards the end of the season) Stingrays managed a respectable 7th-place finish in the Elite League. They beat every team in the league except for the Cardiff Devils at least once, including a spectacular 6–1 victory over the Nottingham Panthers in the final game of the regular season. In the playoff quarter-finals Stingrays were defeated by the Devils 8–4 on aggregate.

2011/2012
The 2011–12 pre-season has seen the Stingrays get off to a promising start, beginning with a home victory and an away draw against owners Coventry Blaze, a draw with English Premier League side Sheffield Steeldogs and impressive victories over Dutch sides Geleen Eaters and Tilburg Trappers in the P&O Ferries Cup which saw them crowned champions. Just after Christmas, star forward, Jereme Tendler was suspended by the EIHL and UKDA after failing a drugs test following a game in Coventry. Tendler disputes the claim and is appealing however could be facing a two-year ban if convicted.

Statistics

Elite Ice Hockey League Record

Season-by-season record

Records
Best Regular Season Finish: 7th out of 10 (2010–11, 2011–12, 2014–15)
Best EIHL Playoff Finish: Semi-finals (2011–12), 4th Place/semi-finals (2014–15)
Most Points In A Regular Season: 52 (2013–14)
Most Wins/Best Record: 24–24–4 (2013–14)
Best Gardiner Conference Position: 2nd out of 5 (2013–14)
Highest Challenge Cup Finish: Quarter-finals (2012–13)
Most Goals In A Regular Season: 178 over 54 games – 3.29 G/GP (2010–11)
Fewest Goals Allowed Regular Season: 174 over 54 games – 3.22 GAA (2006–07)

Current roster 
2013–14 EIHL season

{|
|-
!colspan=7 |Forwards
|- style="background:#ddd;"
!width=5%|Number
!width=5%|
!width=18%|Player
!width=8%|Shoots
!width=7%|Acquired
!width=30%|Place of Birth
!width=37%|Previous Club
|
|- bgcolor="#eeeeee"
| align=center| 
| align=center|
| align=center|Derek Campbell
| align=center|L
| align=center|2013
| align=center|Nepean, Ontario, Canada
| align=center|Coventry Blaze, EIHL
|- bgcolor="#eeeeee"
| align=center| 
| align=center|
| align=center|Guillaume Doucet
| align=center|R
| align=center|2013
| align=center|Moncton, New Brunswick, Canada
| align=center|Morzine-Avoriaz, LMHL
|- bgcolor="#eeeeee"
| align=center|21
| align=center|
| align=center|Jason Silverthorn
| align=center|R
| align=center|2009
| align=center| Owen Sound, Ontario, Canada
| align=center| Cardiff Devils, EIHL
|- bgcolor="#eeeeee"
| align=center|27
| align=center|
| align=center|Jereme Tendler
| align=center|L
| align=center|2010
| align=center| Viceroy, Saskatchewan, Canada
| align=center| Corpus Christi IceRayz, CHL
|- bgcolor="#eeeeee"
| align=center|83
| align=center|
| align=center|Sylvain Cloutier
| align=center|L
| align=center|2009
| align=center| Mont-Laurier, Quebec, Canada
| align=center| Coventry Blaze, EIHL
|- bgcolor="#eeeeee"
| align=center| 
| align=center|
| align=center|Sean Muncy
| align=center|R
| align=center|2013
| align=center| Chesterfield, Missouri, USA
| align=center| Eindhoven Kemphanen, Eredivisie
|- bgcolor="#eeeeee"
| align=center|16
| align=center|
| align=center|Samuel Towner*
| align=center|R
| align=center|2011
| align=center| Kingston upon Hull, East Riding of Yorkshire, England
| align=center| Kingston Jets, ENL
|- bgcolor="#eeeeee"
| align=center|26
| align=center|
| align=center|Matthew Davies
| align=center|L
| align=center|2011
| align=center| Kingston upon Hull, East Riding of Yorkshire, England
| align=center| Peterborough Phantoms, EPIHL
|- bgcolor="#eeeeee"
| align=center|29
| align=center|
| align=center|Tom Squires
| align=center|L
| align=center|2012
| align=center| Sheffield, South Yorkshire, England
| align=center| Sheffield Steeldogs, EPL
|- bgcolor="#eeeeee"
| align=center|''13| align=center|
| align=center|Lee Bonner
| align=center|
| align=center|2013
| align=center| England
| align=center|Hull Stingrays NL, NIHL
|}

 * Denotes two-way contract with Hull Stingrays NIHL – previously known as Kingston Jets

Honours and achievements
As Hull Stingrays.Elite Ice Hockey LeaguePlayoffs (4): 2009–10, 2010–11, 2011–12 (semi-final) & 2013–2014, 2014 - 2015 (semi-final)P&O Ferries CupChampions: 2011English Premier CupRunners-up (1): 2005–06

Honours achieved under previous names.English LeagueChampions (1): 1988–89British Division OneChampions (1): 1991British ChampionshipRunners-up (1): 1993Autumn Cup'''
Runners-up (1): 1991

Owners
 Mike Pack and Sue Pack (2003–2010)
 Andy Buxton, Mike Cowley, Paul Thompson and James Pease (2010–2012)
 Bobby McEwan (2012–2015)

List of Hull Stingrays head coaches
 Rick Strachan (2003–2009)
Sylvain Cloutier (2009–2014)
 Omar Pacha (2014–2015)

Hull Stingrays coaching records

Retired numbers
 No. 10 – Stephen Johnson

References

External links
Hull Stingrays

Ice hockey teams in England
Sport in Kingston upon Hull
Elite Ice Hockey League teams
2003 establishments in England
2015 disestablishments in England
Ice hockey clubs established in 2003
Ice hockey clubs disestablished in 2015